Woman King is the fourth EP from Iron & Wine (aka Samuel Beam), released on February 22, 2005, by Sub Pop Records.

Woman King expanded on the studio sounds that marked his previous LP, Our Endless Numbered Days, and also included electric guitars. Each track featured a spiritual female figure and had subtle Biblical undertones, although Beam has said in interviews that he is agnostic.

Track listing

References

Iron & Wine albums
2005 EPs
Sub Pop EPs